Nkem Owoh  (born 7 February 1946) is a Nigerian actor and comedian. In 2008, he won the African Movie Academy Award for "Best Actor in a Leading Role" for his role in the Nigerian film, "Stronger than Pain".

Early life
Nkem Owoh was born in Enugu State, Nigeria. After his primary and secondary school, he headed to the Federal University of Agriculture, Abeokuta and studied engineering. Already, during his university studies, Owoh began acting in various television and film productions.

Career
He is also known for performing the song "I Go Chop Your Dollar" about advance fee fraud.  The song was featured in the film The Master in which Owoh plays a scammer.
The Economic and Financial Crimes Commission and the Nigerian Broadcasting Commission banned the song.
In 2007 Owoh was arrested in Amsterdam, Netherlands (Bijlmermeer neighborhood in the Amsterdam Zuidoost borough) as the result of a seven-month investigation by the Dutch police dubbed "Operation Apollo". Owoh was arrested while performing a musical show when the police raided the event and arrested 111 people on suspicion of lottery fraud and immigration violations. Owoh was later released.
In November 2009 Owoh was kidnapped in eastern Nigeria.  His kidnappers demanded a 15 million naira ransom. Owoh was released after his family members allegedly paid a ransom fee of 1.4 million naira.

Filmography

References

External links

 - Includes a transcript of the music video in the original Nigerian Pidgin and a translation into English by Azuka Nzegwu and Adeolu Ademoyo

Igbo male actors
Best Actor Africa Movie Academy Award winners
Igbo comedians
Living people
Nigerian male comedians
People from Enugu
Male actors from Enugu State
20th-century Nigerian male actors
21st-century Nigerian male actors
University of Ilorin alumni
Kidnapped Nigerian people
1958 births
Federal University of Agriculture, Abeokuta alumni